The 9th Irish Film & Television Awards took place on Saturday 11 February 2012 at the Convention Centre Dublin (CCD), honouring Irish film and television released in 2011.

It was hosted by Irish actor Simon Delaney. The Show was broadcast on RTÉ One Television on the night.

The ceremony, hosted by the Academy on Saturday 11 February reached a record audience of 1.143 Million viewers* on RTÉ One, clocking up the highest number of Irish viewers to watch the Awards show.

Among the winners at the Irish Film & Television Awards was Michael Fassbender, who picked up the Best Actor IFTA for his stark performance in Steve McQueen's drama Shame. Speaking after receiving his IFTA, Michel said he was "humbled" and "honoured" to accept the accolade from the Irish Academy.

The Guard, Ireland's most successful independent Irish feature film, won four film Awards on the night; Best Film, Director, Screenwriter and Supporting Actress Fionnula Flanagan.

Irish Actress Fionnula Flanagan received the IFTA Lifetime Achievement award.

The TV series Love/Hate won seven awards including Best Drama and Best Director.

Awards

Film categories
 Film
The Guard — Ed Guiney, Andrew Lowe, Chris Cark, Flora Fernandez Marengo
 Albert Nobbs — Alan Moloney, Bonnie Curtis, Julie Lynn, Glenn Close
 Charlie Casanova — Terry McMahon
 Stella Days — Jackie Larkin, Leslie McKimm

 Director in Film
John Michael McDonagh — The Guard
 Rebecca Daly — The Other Side of Sleep
 Terry McMahon — Charlie Casanova
 Thaddeus O'Sullivan — Stella Days

 Script Film
John Michael McDonagh — The Guard
 John Banville, Glenn Close — Albert Nobbs
 Terry McMahon — Charlie Casanova
 Antoine O'Flaherta — Stella Days

 Actor in a Lead Role in a Feature Film
Michael Fassbender — Shame
 Brendan Gleeson — The Guard
 Ciarán Hinds — Tinker Tailor Soldier Spy
 Martin Sheen — Stella Days

 Actress in a Lead Role in a Feature Film
Saoirse Ronan — Hanna
 Aoife Duffin — Behold the Lamb
 Antonia Campbell Hughes — The Other Side of Sleep
 Marcella Plunkett — Stella Days

 Actor in a Supporting Role in a Feature Film
Chris O'Dowd — Bridesmaids
 Liam Cunningham — The Guard
 Brendan Gleeson — Albert Nobbs
 Ciarán Hinds — The Debt

 Actress in a Supporting Role in a Feature Film
Fionnula Flanagan — The Guard
 Maria Doyle Kennedy — Albert Nobbs
 Brenda Fricker — Albert Nobbs
 Amy Huberman — Stella Days

 George Morrison Feature Documentary Award
Bernadette: Notes on a Political Journey — Lelia Doolan
 'Knuckle' — Ian Palmer
 Men of Arlington — Enda Hughes
 Off the Beaten Track — Dieter Auner

 Special Irish Language Award
Corp + Anam – Paddy Hayes
 Mobs Cheanada — Dathai Keane
 Ray McAnally – M'Athair — Brian Reddin
 Seacht — Colin O'Donnell

 Animation
The Boy in the Bubble – Kealan O'Rourke
 23 Degrees 5 Minutes — Darragh O'Connell
 The Last Train — Alex Sherwood
 Origin — James Stacey

 Philips Short Film Award
Foxes – Lorcan Finnegan
 The Boy in the Bubble — Kealan O' Rourke
 Cluck — Michael Lavelle
 Downpour — Claire Dix
 The Shore — Terry George

International categories
 International Film
Tinker Tailor Soldier Spy
 Bridesmaids
 Drive
 Senna

 International Actor
Ryan Gosling — Drive
 Don Cheadle — The Guard
 Leonardo DiCaprio — J. Edgar
 Gary Oldman — Tinker Tailor Soldier Spy

 International Actress
Glenn Close — Albert Nobbs
 Meryl Streep — The Iron Lady
 Tilda Swinton — We Need to Talk About Kevin
 Kristen Wiig — Bridesmaids

Television Drama categories
 Best Drama – In Association with BAI
Love/Hate — Suzanne McAuley, Steve Mattews Corp + Anam — Paddy Hayes
 Game of Thrones — Mark Huffam
 The Borgias — Neil Jordan, James Flynn
 Director – Television DramaDavid Caffrey — Love/Hate
 Neil Jordan — The Borgias
 Brian Kirk — Game of Thrones
 Daniel O'Hara — Being Human

 Writer – Television Drama
Stuart Carolan — Love/Hate
 Neil Jordan — The Borgias
 Ronan Bennett — Hidden
 Daire Mac Con Iomaire — Corp + Anam

 Actor in a Lead Role – Television
Aidan Gillen — Love/Hate
 Diarmuid de Faoite — Corp + Anam
 Chris O'Dowd — The Crimson Petal and the White (TV miniseries)
 David Pearse — Trivia

 Actress in a Lead Role – Television
Ruth Negga — Shirley
 Maria Doyle Kennedy — Corp + Anam
 Michelle Fairley — Game of Thrones
 Aisling O'Sullivan — Raw

 Actor in a Supporting Role – Television
Tom Vaughan-Lawlor — Love/Hate
 Brendan Coyle — Downton Abbey
 Aidan Gillen — Game of Thrones
 Robert Sheehan — Misfits

 Actress in a Supporting Role – Television
Denise McCormack — Love/Hate
 Eva Birthistle — Strike Back
 Bronagh Gallagher — The Field of Blood
 Ruth Negga — Misfits

Craft/Technical categories (Film/TV Drama)
 Costume Design
Consolata Boyle — The Iron Lady
 Joan Bergin — Camelot
 Eimer Ní Mhaoldomhnaigh — Neverland
 Lorna Marie Mugan — Treasure Island

 Director of Photography
Seamus McGarvey — We Need to Talk About Kevin
 Seamus Deasy — Neverland
 Suzie Lavelle — The Other Side of Sleep
 Robbie Ryan — Wuthering Heights

 Editing
Isobel Stephenson — Love/Hate
 Dermot Diskin — Stella Days
 Tony Kearns — Charlie Casanova
 Úna Ní Dhonghaíle — Camelot

 M.A.C Make-up & Hair
Lorraine Glynn/ Lynn Johnson — Albert Nobbs
 Dee Corcoran/Tom Mc Inerney — Camelot
 Ailbhe Lemass/Lorraine Glynn — Neverland
 Joni Galvin/Eileen Buggy — Stella Days

 Original Score
Brian Byrne — Albert Nobbs
 Darragh O'Toole — Ballymun Lullaby
 Stephen McKeon — Legends of Valhalla: Thor
 Ray Harman — Love/Hate

 Production Design
Anna Rackard – Stella Days
 Tom Conroy — Camelot
 Stephen Daly — Love/Hate
 John Paul Kelly — The Guard

 Sound
Albert Nobbs — Brendan Deasy, Niall Brady, Michelle Cunniffe, Steve Fanagan
 Game of Thrones — Ronan Hill, Sound Post Production Team
 Love/Hate — Brendan Deasy, Mark Henry, Fiadhnait McCann
 The Guard — Robert Flanagan, Michelle Cuniffe, Niall Brady

Craft/Technical categories (Television)
 Director – Television
Gary Keane – The Writing in the Sky
 Liz Gill — A Story with Me in It
 Lynda McQuaid — MasterChef Ireland
 Kieron J. Walsh — The Savage Eye

 Director of Photography – Television
Peter Robertson – Waterways
 Richard Kendrick — Two for the Road
 Michael O'Donovan — The Writing in the Sky
 Kieron Skyne — Departure Day

 Editing – Television
Ray Roantree – The Ashes of 9/11
 Ailbhe Gaffney — MasterChef Ireland
 Mick Mahon — The Writing in the Sky
 Emer Reynolds — Broken Tail

 Sound – Television
The Writing in the Sky – Killian Fitzgerald, Aza Hand
  — Sam Horgan
 MasterChef Ireland — Trevor Cunningham
 Punky — Emma Butt

Television categories
 Children's/Youth Programme
The Importance of Being Whatever – Martina Niland, David Collins
 OMG! Jedward's Dream Factory — Noleen Golding
 Punky — Gerard O'Rourke
 The Amazing World of Gumball — Anne Tweedy, Peter Lewis

 Current Affairs/News
Prime Time Investigates: The Home Care Scandal — Adrian Lydon
 Prime Time Investigates: Carry on Regardless — Bill Malone
 The Frontline: The Presidential Debate — Michael Hughes
 State Visit to Ireland of Queen Elizabeth II — John O'Regan

 Documentary Series
Waterways — Stephen Rooke
 The Meaning of Life with Gay Byrne — Roger Childs
 Mobs Cheanada — Dathai Keane
 The Tenements — Jane Kelly

 Documentary
The Blood of the Travellers — Liam McGrath
 Father Ted: Small, Far Away – The World of Father Ted — Faye Hill
 Ray McAnally — Brian Reddin
 The Irish of 9/11 — Maurice Sweeney

 Entertainment Programme
Mrs. Brown's Boys — Brendan O'Carroll, Justin Healy
 Hardy Bucks — Mike Cockayne
 MasterChef Ireland — Larry Bass
 The Savage Eye — Sideline Productions

 Factual Programme
The Only Viking in the Village – Anne Heffernan, Bernadine Carraher'
 Secret Millionaire — Ronan O. Muirthile
 Story of Ireland — Mike Connolly
 The Belfast Blitz — Andrea McCartney

 Reality Programme
ICA Bootcamp – Independent Pictures
 Celebrity Bainisteoir — Fiona Looney
 Head Chef — Billy McGrath
 The Apprentice — Larry Bass

 Sports
Eamon Coughlan – Man on a Mission – Motive Television
 Frank O'Farrell – The Shadow of Busby — Sean Doyle
 Pilgrims – The Irish at Cheltenham — Maurice Sweeney
 Rory's Major Breakthrough — Stephen Watson

 RTÉ Guide Best TV Moment of the Year
Shamrock Rovers Europa League Qualifying Goal – Setanta Ireland

References

External links
 

2012 in Irish television
9